Liocheles australasiae, the dwarf wood scorpion, is a species of scorpion belonging to the family Hormuridae.

Distribution

This species is present in India, Sri Lanka, Bangladesh, Yaeyama Islands (Japan), China, Thailand, Vietnam, Malaysia, Philippines, Taiwan, Mariana Islands, Indonesia, Australia, Papua New Guinea, Solomon Islands, New Caledonia, Fiji, Tonga, Samoa and French Polynesia.

Description
This small scorpion has the total length of 22 to 36 mm. Patella of pedipalps with 3 ventral trichobothria. Body uniformly reddish to yellowish brown. Telson yellow. Median and three lateral pigmented eyes present, which are not troglobitic. Chelicerae are yellowish brown, and reticulated. Carapace without carinae. but punctate and bears a straight median longitudinal groove. There are 4 to 8 pectinal teeth. Metasomal segments are sparsely setose and finely punctate. Pedipalps also covered by granules. Ventrum of pedipalp is punctate. In males, the fingers of chela are conspicuously flexed. 

Most of the populations are parthenogenetic, where they can produce young without males. In Sri Lanka, three females were discovered from Bentota, Galle, without a male, but all specimens were females or juveniles. Specimens are observed inside a stone wall and under old bark of branches and also in dry leaves and under the flower pots in home garden.

Bibliography
 Yamazaki K, Yahata H, Kobayashi N, Makioka T. Egg maturation and parthenogenetic recovery of diploidy in the scorpion Liocheles australasiae (Fabricius) (Scorpions, ischnuridae).
 TOSHIKI MAKIOKA Reproductive biology of the viviparous scorpion, Liocheles australasiae (Fabricius) (Arachnida, Scorpiones, Ischnuridae) IV. Pregnancy in females isolated from infancy, with notes on juvenile stage duration
 Fabricius, 1775 : Systema entomologiae, sistens insectorum classes, ordines, genera, species, adiectis, synonymis, locis descriptionibus observationibus. Flensburg and Lipsiae.
 Monod, 2011 : Taxonomic emendations in the genus Liocheles Sundevall, 1833 (Scorpiones, Liochelidae). Revue Suisse de Zoologie, vol. 118, no 4, p. 723-758.

See also
Lesser brown scorpion

References

Hormuridae
Animals described in 1775
Scorpions of Asia
Taxa named by Johan Christian Fabricius
Scorpions of Australia